The African American population in San Antonio, Texas has been a significant part of the city's community since its founding. African Americans have been a part of the Greater San Antonio's history since the late 1800s. San Antonio ranks as the top Texas city for Black professionals.

History 
The first Africans that lived in San Antonio were Afro-Mexicans when Texas was still a part of Mexico before the Mexican–American War. African slaves arrived in 1528 in Spanish Texas. In 1792, there were 34 blacks and 414 mulattos in Spanish Texas. Anglo white immigration into Mexican Texas in the 1820s brought an increased numbers of slaves. Many African Americans in Texas remained in slavery until after the U.S. Civil War ended. There was scarce Union Army activity in Texas, preventing them from joining the Northern lines. During the Reconstruction era, newly emancipated African American slaves began moving from rural areas in Texas to San Antonio, establishing Freedmen's Towns on the city's East Side. Ellis Alley was one of the first African-American neighborhoods in San Antonio. The census recorded 592 African-American slaves of 3,488 total residents living in San Antonio in 1850, five years after Texas joined the United States. Although slavery ended after the U.S. Civil War, by the mid-1870s racial segregation became codified throughout the South, including Texas. African Americans left Texas by the tens of thousands during the Great Migration in the first half of the 20th century, seeking work and political opportunities elsewhere.  African Americans in San Antonio were poorly represented by the predominantly white state legislature and city council, and were politically disenfranchised during the Jim Crow era; whites had used a variety of tactics, including militias and legislation, to re-establish political and social supremacy throughout the South. Racial segregation ended in the mid-1960s. On March 16, 1960, San Antonio became the first southern city to begin integration of its small restaurants when Richard Hunt sat at the lunch counter of the Woolworth's lunch counter in Alamo Plaza. In the 1970s, the African American population in San Antonio was 7.6 percent. Forbes ranked San Antonio in one of The Top 10 Cities Where African-Americans Are Doing The Best Economically. San Antonio ranks as the top Texas destination city for Black professionals and entrepreneurs. In addition to the New Great Migration, many African Americans in the US are now recently moving to San Antonio for lower cost of living and more job opportunities. San Antonio's Black population also increased by more than 10,000 throughout the decade. When the census numbers were collected last year, there were nearly 94,000 non-Hispanic Black residents were living in the city, amounting to 6.5 percent of the total population. 13 percent increase from the number of residents recorded in 2010. An additional 25,000 to 35,000 mostly black evacuees arrived in 2005 from the New Orleans metro after Hurricane Katrina with many of them deciding to stay in San Antonio. Ivy Taylor was also the first African American to be elected mayor of San Antonio and only the second woman in the position.

Demographics  
In the 1970s, The African American population in San Antonio was 7.6 percent. The number of blacks increased in San Antonio, growing by 25 percent throughout the last decade, which was a surge of more than 29,000 people. Nearly 148,000 blacks were living in Bexar County by 2020. They accounted for 7.4 percent of Bexar County's population up from 6.9 percent in 2010 and still increasing. The median household income for black families in San Antonio is $45,745 and the average house cost is $187,478. 

The East Side of San Antonio has a large concentration of predominantly African American residents. Denver Heights is historically one of the oldest black neighborhoods in San Antonio. Outside of the East Side, the San Antonio black population of both working and middle-class black families is located on the diverse Northeast Side in areas like Camelot, Converse, Sunrise and Dignowity Hill as their presence has been around since the 1980s and 90s.

Politics 

Ivy Taylor was the first African American to be elected mayor of San Antonio and only the second woman in the position. In addition, Taylor was the first female African-American mayor of a city with a population of more than one million. Taylor was elected to San Antonio City Council in 2009 to represent District 2 on the east side of the city, and was re-elected to the body in 2011 and 2013. In 2021, Councilmember Jalen McKee-Rodriguez was elected to serve City Council District 2. The Alamo City Black Chamber of Commerce in San Antonio was established in April, 1938.

Media  
The San Antonio Observer is a weekly tabloid established in 1995, and bills itself as the only African American newspaper in San Antonio. The newspaper attracted national attention in 2016 when it held a news conference for a police   shooting of an unarmed Black man, and announced, then later retracted, a threat to reveal the addresses of all police officers in San Antonio.

Cultural institutions 
The San Antonio African American Community Archive and Museum (SAAACAM) is a digital archive and museum located in the La Villita Historic Arts Village District near the San Antonio River Walk.

100 Black Men of San Antonio, Inc. is to improve the quality of life within the communities and enhance educational and economic opportunities for youth in the community.

The Alamo City Black Chamber of Commerce serves and supports black businesses and professionals.

Education

Colleges and universities 
St. Philip's College is a public community college located in San Antonio, accredited by the Southern Association of Colleges and Schools. It is the westernmost HBCU in the United States. St. Philip's College, a part of the Alamo Colleges District, currently serves more than 11,000 students in over 70 different academic and technical disciplines. It is the only college to be federally designated as both a historically black college and a Hispanic-serving institution.

Primary and secondary schools 
Sam Houston High School, is a historically African American public high school with a Hispanic student body. It is one of the first African American high Schools in San Antonio; it is located in eastern San Antonio and classified as a 4A school by the UIL. This school is one of twelve schools in the San Antonio Independent School District. In 2015, the school was rated "Met Standard" by the Texas Education Agency.

Religion 
Mount Zion First Baptist Church is an historic African American church located at 333 Martin Luther King Drive in San Antonio, Texas. Founded in 1871 by former slaves, the church has since provided ministerial services to thousands and played a major role in the Civil Rights Movement of the city. In 1949 the Reverend Claude Black Jr. became pastor and lead the church to national prominence in the National Baptist Convention. Pastor Black who would become a Civil Rights icon and city councilman would invite figures controversial at the time to speak from his pulpit. Some of those would include Thurgood Marshall, Adam Clayton Powell Jr., Azie Taylor Morton, Percy Sutton, Barbara Jordan and others. The church created the city's first black owned credit union as well as Project Free, a program dedicated to assisting the poor and the elderly. The church was burned down by arson in 1974, but rebuilt the following year.

Events and recreation 
Notable African-American cultural point of interest includes the San Antonio African American Community Archive & Museum.

Juneteenth 
Juneteenth is an annual celebration recognizing the emancipation of black slaves in Texas. President Lincoln signed the Emancipation Proclamation and published it on January 1, 1863, but it did not reach Texas until June 19, 1865. Over the next few years, African-American populations across Texas collected money to buy property dedicated to Juneteenth celebrations.

The State of Texas made Juneteenth a holiday at the state level after Al Edwards, a member of the Texas House of Representatives from Houston, proposed it as a bill.

MLK March 
In 1987, the City of San Antonio’s Martin Luther King, Jr. Commission held its first official march, building on marches that have occurred since 1968. The event typically draws more than 300,000 participants and is one of the largest in the United States.

San Antonio Black Restaurant Week  
San Antonio is renowned for its food trucks, restaurants and cuisines and black owned restaurants play a large part in the annual event. San Antonio Black Restaurant Week will showcase food trucks and Black-owned businesses such as health and wellness, catering and event planning companies.

San Antonio Royal Steppaz 
San Antonio Royal Steppaz is an African American trail riding group founded during the pandemic to connect members to nature and history.

Notable residents 

 Al Freeman Jr., American actor 
 Sterling Houston, experimental playwright
 Terence Steele is an American NFL football offensive tackle for the Dallas Cowboys.
 Sam Hurd, former American NFL football wide receiver 
 G. J. Sutton (June 22, 1909 – June 22, 1976) was the first black official elected from San Antonio, Texas
 Artemisia Bowden (January 1, 1879 – August 18, 1969) was an African American school administrator and civil rights activist.
 Cadillac Muzik, Hip Hop group 
 Shaquille O'Neal, American professional retired basketball player, graduated from Robert G. Cole High School
 Bo Outlaw, American professional retired basketball player
 Phillip Martin III, rapper
 David Robinson, former San Antonio Spur
 Clifford Scott, American saxophonist and flautist
 BillyRay Sheppard, saxophonist and recording artist
 Ivy Taylor, former mayor of San Antonio 
 Mel Waiters, American R&B singer

See also 

 History of African Americans in Texas
 History of African Americans in Dallas–Fort Worth
 History of African Americans in Houston
 History of African Americans in Austin

References 
https://www.blacksinsanantonio.com/

History of San Antonio
 
African-American history of Texas